The 2022 FIVB Volleyball Women's World Championship was the 19th staging of the FIVB Volleyball Women's World Championship, contested by the senior women's national teams of the members of the  (FIVB). The Netherlands and Poland were dual hosts for this event.

Serbia won their second title for the consecutive edition, beating Brazil in straight sets. Italy took the Bronze medal defeating USA. Tijana Bošković was again the recipient of the MVP award of the tournament.

Host selection
On 19 January 2019, FIVB announced that Netherlands and Poland were selected as dual hosts for this event. It is the first time that the women's World Championship has been hosted by two countries.

Qualification

The host countries Netherlands and Poland automatically qualified for the competition as well as the current world champions Serbia. The top two teams from each of the 2021 Continental Championships secured qualification. The final 11 places belonged to top 11 teams as per FIVB World Ranking who had not yet qualified.

On 1 March 2022, FIVB declared Russia and Belarus ineligible to compete in international and continental competitions due to the 2022 Russian invasion of Ukraine. As a result, Russia were out of the championship. After Russia was removed from the competition, Croatia was invited to compete as the next highest ranked team in the World Ranking.

Squads

Venues

Format

First round
In the first round, the 24 teams were spread across four pools of six teams playing in a round-robin system. The top four teams from each pool advanced to the second round.

Second round
In the second round, the 16 teams were allocated in two pools of eight teams (top teams from first round pools A and D in one and top teams from pools B and C in the other). Once again a round-robin system was used in each pool, teams coming from the same first round pool (therefore already played each other) only played against opponents from a different first round pool. The second round standings took the results in the first and second rounds into account. The top four teams of each group advanced to the final round.

Final round
The top four teams of each pool played in quarterfinals. The winners advanced to semifinals. The semifinals winners advanced to compete for the World Championship title. The losers faced each other in the third place match.

Pools composition

First round
Teams were seeded in the first two positions of each pool following the Serpentine system according to their FIVB World Ranking as per end of 2021. FIVB reserved the right to seed the hosts as heads of pool A and B. The better ranked hosted team (10) allocated to pool A, and another team (12) allocated to pool B. All teams not seeded were drawn to take other available positions in the remaining lines following the World Ranking.

Draw

Second round

Pool standing procedure
 Total number of victories (matches won, matches lost)
 In the event of a tie, the following first tiebreaker will apply: The teams will be ranked by the most point gained per match as follows:
 Match won 3–0 or 3–1: 3 points for the winner, 0 points for the loser
 Match won 3–2: 2 points for the winner, 1 point for the loser
 Match forfeited: 3 points for the winner, 0 points (0–25, 0–25, 0–25) for the loser
 If teams are still tied after examining the number of victories and points gained, then the FIVB will examine the results in order to break the tie in the following order:
 Set quotient: if two or more teams are tied on the number of points gained, they will be ranked by the quotient resulting from the division of the number of all set won by the number of all sets lost.
 Points quotient: if the tie persists based on the set quotient, the teams will be ranked by the quotient resulting from the division of all points scored by the total of points lost during all sets.
 If the tie persists based on the point quotient, the tie will be broken based on the team that won the match of the Round Robin Phase between the tied teams. When the tie in point quotient is between three or more teams, these teams ranked taking into consideration only the matches involving the teams in question.

First round
 All times are Central European Summer Time (UTC+02:00).
 The top four teams in each pool qualified for the second phase.

Pool A

|}

|}

Pool B

|}

|}

Pool C

|}

|}

Pool D

|}

|}

Second round
 All times are Central European Summer Time (UTC+02:00).
 The top four teams qualified for the final phase.
 The results of all the matches in the first round were taken into account for this round.

Pool E

|} 

|}

Pool F

|}

|}

Final round
 All times are Central European Summer Time (UTC+02:00).

Quarterfinals
|}

Semifinals
|}

3rd place match
|}

Final
|}

Final standing

Source: WCH 2022 final standings

Awards

Most Valuable Player

Best Setter

Best Outside Spikers

Best Opposite Spiker

Best Middle Blockers

Best Libero

Statistics leaders

Statistics leaders correct as of final round.

See also

2022 FIVB Volleyball Men's World Championship

Notes

References

External links
Fédération Internationale de Volleyball – official website
2022 Women's World Championship – official website

 
FIVB World Championship
2022
World Championship, Women, 2022
World Championship, Women, 2022
World Championship, 2022
World Championship, 2022
2022 in Dutch women's sport
2022 in Polish women's sport
Sports events affected by the 2022 Russian invasion of Ukraine
September 2022 sports events in the Netherlands
September 2022 sports events in Poland
October 2022 sports events in the Netherlands
October 2022 sports events in Poland